The Maju Expressway (MEX) (formerly known as Kuala Lumpur–Putrajaya Expressway (KLPE) and KL–KLIA Dedicated Expressway)  (Malay: Lebuhraya Kuala Lumpur-Putrajaya) is an expressway network in Klang Valley, Malaysia. The -long expressway links the Kuala Lumpur City Centre with the Kuala Lumpur International Airport (KLIA) in Sepang, Selangor. The expressway is a backbone of the Multimedia Super Corridor (MSC) area.

The Kilometre Zero is located at Kampung Pandan Interchange, Kuala Lumpur, just outside the Tun Razak Exchange.

History

Construction of Maju Expressway started on 6 December 2004 and completed on 5 December 2007. It was open to motorists on 13 December 2007. This expressway provided fast and convenient connectivity between Kuala Lumpur, the capital of Malaysia and Putrajaya – the new Malaysian Government Administrative Centre, Cyberjaya – the core of the Multimedia Super Corridor (MSC) and KLIA.

MEX is operated by Maju Expressway Sdn Bhd (MESB), the concessionaire that has been awarded a 33-year concession to operate the dual carriageway.

Extending 26 km in its first phase, MEX is designated as the Protocol Expressway that links Putrajaya, Cyberjaya, KLIA and LCCT with Kuala Lumpur. MEX reduce traveling time between Putrajaya to Kuala Lumpur from about 60 minutes to 30 minutes, or half the previous travelling time with five interchanges: Kampung Pandan, Salak South, Kuchai Lama, Bukit Jalil and Putrajaya Utama (Putrajaya Main).

Seri Kembangan interchange (Exit 2004A) began operations at 13 January 2016, providing access from MEX to Seri Kembangan (formerly Serdang), Puchong and Universiti Putra Malaysia (UPM).

Maju Expressway will extend to KLIA by Dec 2019 and the route will be 18 km-long, three-lane dual carriageway and commence at Putrajaya Main Interchange.

Controversial issues

Noise and cracks at Sri Petaling 
The development stage of the Kuala Lumpur-Putrajaya Expressway created a controversy due to the effects of the construction to the houses of the residents in Sri Petaling. There were several cracks reported to some houses, fueling protests among the Sri Petaling residents against the construction of the expressway.

According to the residents, the expressway was reported to be built too near to residential houses, which was claimed by Sri Petaling residents as violating the expressway construction standards. The expressway which was built too near to the residential areas (only 2 m from residential houses) also causes concerns about noise pollution as well as safety issues that would be caused by the expressway.

Despite of  the complaints and protests by the residents, the Malaysian Minister of Works, Datuk Seri S. Samy Vellu insisted that sound barriers would be installed along the Sri Petaling section and the Sri Petaling flyover would be made higher to reduce noise pollution.

Last-minute motorcycle ban on the expressway 
On 31 January 2008, Datuk Seri S. Samy Vellu officially banned all motorcycles from using the Kuala Lumpur-Putrajaya Expressway, which was said due to "safety reasons" due to the so-called "limited space" on the expressway. Ironically, the double-decked Kerinchi Link of the Sprint Expressway which was almost similar in terms of design (except for the double-deck design) is allowed to be used by all motorcyclists. Originally, motorcyclists were used to be allowed on the expressway and both Putrajaya and Salak toll plazas included motorcycle lanes.

Several weeks before the official ban, there were some reported cases of motorcyclists being chased away from the expressway by the concessionaire staff. The last-minute ban fueled anger among motorcyclists especially in Kuala Lumpur and Putrajaya and viewed as a discrimination against Malaysian motorcyclists. Even with motorcycle ban, there are less driver travelling on this expressway.

On 6 June 2008, the motorcycle ban was lifted by the new Minister of Works, Datuk Ir. Mohd Zin Mohamed as an effort to encourage people to use motorcycles as a more fuel-economic alternative to cars. The decision was made as a result of the recent Malaysian fuel price hike where the price of RON97 petrol was increased from RM1.92 to RM2.70.

Features
 The expressway provides Traffic Control and Surveillance System (TCSS) that comprises vehicle detectors and closed circuit television (CCTV) cameras.
 Emergency telephones and Variable Message Signs (VMS)
 MEX Ronda patrol ready to aid drivers who require assistance on the expressway.
 Entire Expressway is fully lit at night which contributes to driving comfort and safety.
 90 km/h speed limit
 Many flyovers along the expressways including Tun Razak, Salak South and Sri Petaling–Bukit Jalil.
 Long straight sections between Bukit Jalil and Seri Kembangan.
 Views of Kuala Lumpur skyline from Salak South.

Tolls
The Maju Expressway uses opened toll systems.

Electronic Toll Collections 
As part of an initiative to facilitate faster transaction at the Salak South, Seri Kembangan and Putrajaya Toll Plaza, all toll transactions at three toll plazas on the Maju Expressway have been conducted electronically via Touch 'n Go cards or SmartTAGs since 13 January 2016.

Toll rates

Salak South Toll Plaza

Seri Kembangan toll plaza

Putrajaya Main Toll Plaza

Note: Toll charges can only be paid with the Touch 'n Go cards or SmartTAG. Cash payment is not accepted.

Interchanges

References

External links
 Maju Holdings Berhad
 Maju Expressway Sdn Bhd
 MEX toll rates to go up on October 15

2007 establishments in Malaysia
Expressways in Malaysia
Expressways and highways in the Klang Valley
Roads in Selangor
MSC Malaysia
Sepang District